Qazvineh (also Romanized as Qazvīneh; also known as Kazvina) is a village in Qazvineh Rural District, in the Central District of Kangavar County, Kermanshah Province, Iran. At the 2006 census, its population was 173, in 46 families.

References 

Populated places in Kangavar County